Apne Rang Hazaar is a 1975 Hindi-language film, which was directed by director Ravi Tandon. The soundtrack is composed by Laxmikant–Pyarelal and features playback singer Lata Mangeshkar and Kishore Kumar. The cast included actors like Asrani, Bindu and others.

Cast

 Sanjeev Kumar as Sunil
 Leena Chandavarkar as Malti 'Mala'
 Kamini Kaushal as Sunil's mother
 G. Asrani as Pitamber Shastri ji
 Shyama (Hindi actress) as Padma - Ram Charan's sister
 Bindu as Rita
 Danny Denzongpa as Vicky
 Helen
 Jankidas as Sunil's uncle
 Sudhir as inspector Dinesh
 Satyen kappu as Ram Charan
 Jagdish Raj as vakil Saheb
 Raj Kishore one who telephones Kamini Kaushal
Paintal as Nilamber
Mc Mohan as Shekhar

Music

Trivia
In the scene when Kamini Kaushal is dancing on recorded songs, the three songs are taken from film Anhonee (1973) which was also directed by Ravi Tandon, and also starring Sanjeev Kumar & Leena Chandavarkar.

References

External links
 

1975 films
1970s Hindi-language films
Films scored by Laxmikant–Pyarelal
Films directed by Ravi Tandon